Goshen Coach was an American cutaway bus builder located in Salina, Kansas. 

The company was founded in 1985 and was owned by Thor Industries from 2005 until August 2013, when Thor sold the company to Allied Specialty Vehicles (later renamed REV Group). REV Group closed the Goshen Coach factory was closed on October 31, 2016. 

After the closure, REV continued to use the Goshen Coach name for some buses built at the ElDorado facility in Salina, Kansas and the Champion Bus facility in Imlay City, Michigan.

In May 2020, REV sold its cutaway bus businesses to Forest River, including the Goshen Coach brand name. Since the acquisition by Forest River, the Goshen Coach brand name is no longer in use.

Models
Pacer II - Small, narrow-body, cutaway bus.  Non-CDL, up to 15 passengers. Available on Ford E-350 chassis.
Impulse - Small to mid-size, wide-body, cutaway bus.  Up to 28 passengers. Available on Ford E-Series or Chevrolet Express chassis.
G-Force - Large, cutaway bus. Up to 33 passengers. Available on Ford F-Series Super Duty chassis.

References 

Bus manufacturers of the United States
Companies based in Kansas
Salina, Kansas